Kirby Fabien (born September 10, 1990) is a former professional Canadian football offensive lineman and is the offensive line coach for the UBC Thunderbirds football team of U Sports.

University career
Fabien played CIS football for the Calgary Dinos from 2008 to 2012.

Professional career

BC Lions
After the 2011 CIS season, he was ranked as the 15th best player in the Canadian Football League’s Amateur Scouting Bureau final rankings for players eligible in the 2012 CFL Draft, and ninth by players in Canadian Interuniversity Sport. He was selected seventh overall by the BC Lions in the 2012 CFL Draft, but on May 28, 2012, the Calgary Dinos announced that he would be returning to play another year with them. He signed with the Lions during the following off-season on May 27, 2013. He spent five years with the Lions and played in 77 regular season games before becoming a free agent in 2018.

Montreal Alouettes
After remaining unsigned for over three months, Fabien signed with the Montreal Alouettes on May 24, 2018. He played in five games before being released on July 25, 2018.

Coaching career
In 2021, Fabien was hired by his old coach, Blake Nill, to serve as the offensive line coach for the UBC Thunderbirds.

References

External links
 Montreal Alouettes profile
 Canadian Football League profile
 
 

1990 births
Living people
Players of Canadian football from Alberta
Canadian football offensive linemen
Calgary Dinos football players
Canadian football people from Calgary
BC Lions players
Montreal Alouettes players
UBC Thunderbirds football coaches